Zoran Roje (born 7 October 1955) is a Croatian former professional water polo player and coach. As a member of the Yugoslavia national team, he won the gold medal at the 1984 Summer Olympics and the silver medal at the 1980 Summer Olympics. Born in Split, he has led the Croatia national team to the silver medal at the 2003 European Championship held in Kranj.

See also
 Yugoslavia men's Olympic water polo team records and statistics
 List of Olympic champions in men's water polo
 List of Olympic medalists in water polo (men)
 List of World Aquatics Championships medalists in water polo

References

External links
 

1955 births
Living people
Water polo players from Split, Croatia
Croatian male water polo players
Yugoslav male water polo players
Olympic water polo players of Yugoslavia
Water polo players at the 1980 Summer Olympics
Water polo players at the 1984 Summer Olympics
Medalists at the 1980 Summer Olympics
Medalists at the 1984 Summer Olympics
Olympic gold medalists for Yugoslavia
Olympic silver medalists for Yugoslavia
Olympic medalists in water polo
Competitors at the 1979 Mediterranean Games
Competitors at the 1983 Mediterranean Games
Mediterranean Games gold medalists for Yugoslavia
Mediterranean Games medalists in water polo
Croatian water polo coaches
Croatia men's national water polo team coaches
Water polo coaches at the 2004 Summer Olympics